The Velvet Vampire, also known as Cemetery Girls, is a 1971 American vampire film directed by Stephanie Rothman. It stars Celeste Yarnall, Michael Blodgett, Sherry Miles, Gene Shane, Jerry Daniels, Sandy Ward, and Paul Prokop. It has been cited as a cult film.

Plot
Lee Ritter (Michael Blodgett) and his  wife Susan (Sherry Miles) accept the invitation of the mysterious Diane LeFanu (Celeste Yarnall) to visit her in her secluded desert estate. Tensions arise when the couple, who are unaware that Diane is in reality a centuries-old vampire, realize that they are both objects of the pale temptress's seductions.

Cast
 Celeste Yarnall as Diane LeFanu
 Michael Blodgett as Lee Ritter
 Sherry Miles as Susan Ritter
 Gene Shane as Carl Stoker
 Jerry Daniels as Juan
 Sandy Ward as Amos
 Paul Prokop as Cliff
 Chris Woodley as Cliff's Girl
 Robert Tessier as The Biker
 Johnny Shines as The Bluesman

Production
The film was Stephanie Rothman's follow-up to her 1970 hit The Student Nurses. She and her husband Charles Swartz had written a script, The Student Teachers, but producer Larry Woolner wanted to make a vampire film after the success of Daughters of Darkness (1970). Rothman and Swartz came up with a present-day vampire story originally entitled Through the Looking Glass. Rothman wanted to make the vampire female and have a woman as the protagonist rather than the victim. The character name "Diane Le Fanu" was a reference to author Sheridan Le Fanu, writer of Carmilla. The art gallery where Lee and Susan first meet Diane is called "The Stoker" after its owner, the character Carl Stoker, an evident reference to Bram Stoker, the author of Dracula.

The script was written over three months. Rothman added comedic elements to make it different from similar material.

Blues artist Johnny Shines appeared in the movie and performed his self-penned song "Evil-Hearted Woman."

The movie was shot in February 1971. Yarnall, who had just given birth, remembers "everyone was very accommodating, just a joy to work with. Stephanie ... was wonderful, open. It was my first experience having a female director and it was remarkable especially concerning the sexual scenes. Stephanie was very sensitive. She closed the set during the more explicit shots, and there was often just Michael and I and the cameraman."

Reception
Roger Corman later claimed he was disappointed with the final product and released it on a double bill with an Italian horror film, Scream of the Demon Lover.

It has become a cult film.

Box office
Stephanie Rothman admitted the film's commercial reception was disappointing. She thought the problem may have been the movie:
Fell between two stools. It's not a traditional horror film nor a hard-core exploitation movie. In some places it was booked into art theatres. In others it had one-week saturation release in drive-ins and hard-top theaters. There was no consistent distribution pattern for it because people responded differently to it and I think that may be part of the problem. Also it was an independent producer. There were a lot of other competing vampire movies at the time with star names. ... But the film has not been forgotten. It keeps popping up at festivals and retrospectives, even though it did not draw attention to itself at the box office.

Critical
The Los Angeles Times wrote "Miss Rothman is at her best in love scenes... handled with rare sensual beauty and taste. Unfortunately there's little else to be said for The Velvet Vampire."

See also
 List of American films of 1971

References

External links
 
 A review of the movie

1971 films
American vampire films
Vampire comedy films
1971 horror films
American comedy horror films
Films set in country houses
Erotic fantasy films
1970s comedy horror films
New World Pictures films
1971 comedy films
1970s English-language films
1970s American films